The 1982 Open Championship was a men's major golf championship and the 111th Open Championship, held from 15–18 July at Royal Troon Golf Club in Troon, Scotland. Tom Watson won his fourth Open Championship, one stroke ahead of runners-up Peter Oosterhuis and Nick Price. It was Watson's second consecutive major victory—he won the U.S. Open a month earlier—and the seventh of his eight major titles.

Watson became the fifth to win the U.S. Open and the Open Championship in the same year, joining fellow Americans Bobby Jones (1926, 1930), Gene Sarazen (1932), Ben Hogan (1953), and Lee Trevino (1971). Tiger Woods later won both in 2000.

Watson's previous three Open wins also came in Scotland, at Carnoustie (1975), Turnberry (1977), and Muirfield (1980). His fifth victory in the Open in 1983 came at Royal Birkdale in England.

Course

Old Course 

Lengths of the course for previous Opens (since 1950):

Opens from 1962 through 1989 played the 11th hole as a par-5.

Past champions in the field

Made both cuts

Missed the second cut

Missed the first cut

Round summaries

First round
Thursday, 15 July 1982

Source:

Second round
Friday, 16 July 1982

Amateurs: Lewis (+4), Oldcorn (+9), Plaxton (+9), Stubbs (+10), Thompson (+10), Broadbent (+12), Persson (+12), Rose (+12), Thomson (+12), Ray (+13), Andersson (+16), Young (+17), Higgins (+19), Poxon (+19), Crosby (+22).

Third round
Saturday, 17 July 1982

Amateurs: Lewis (+5).

Final round
Sunday, 18 July 1982

Amateurs: Lewis (+12)Source:

References

External links
Royal Troon 1982 (Official site)
111th Open Championship - Royal Troon (European Tour)

The Open Championship
Golf tournaments in Scotland
Open Championship
Open Championship
Open Championship